Ron Nesher (born 25 August 1983), known by his stage name SkyDaMac or Sky, is an Israeli rapper, songwriter and composer.

Personal life
Ran Menasherov was born in Tel-Aviv, Israel, to a Jewish family. He resides in Ramat Gan with Yafit Amon, her son from a previous marriage, and their two daughters.

Biography 
In 2007 Nesher released his first song "Lo Ba Stam" with the Jewish reggae and hip hop group Yamanz.

After his military service in the Anti-aircraft warfare of Heyl Ha'Avir Nesher signed to the record label of the Israeli rapper Subliminal, TACT Records. After that in 2010 he formed with Omri 69 Segal, E-Z and Ron B the hip hop group "The Idioteam", In 2011 they released their debut mixtape "Mi Idiot".

In 2014 Nesher wrote to the Israeli singer Eliad Nachum some songs of his debut album Siman; "Siman", "Hofshi", "Miklat" and "Att". at the same year he posted on his Facebook page a post against Hanin Zuabi, an Israeli Knesset member, the post was viral for this period.

In 2015 Nesher released the song "DubiGal" featuring Static & Ben El Tavori and Jordi, the song got many praises.

In 2018 he released his debut album Rosh HaAinshtein/Einlonimus, a double album which includes 24 tracks and guest appearances from Moshik Afia, Omri 69 Segal and Shaked Komemy, among others.

Discography

 2011: Mi Idiot (with The Idioteam)
2018: Rosh HaAyinstein/Einlonimus

See also 
 Israeli hip hop
 Music of Israel

References

External links
 
 
 Ron Nesher on Spotify
 Ron Nesher on ITunes
 

1983 births
21st-century Israeli  male singers
Israeli impressionists (entertainers)
Israeli Jews
Israeli male singer-songwriters
Israeli people of Yemeni-Jewish descent
Israeli people of Polish-Jewish descent
Israeli people of Russian-Jewish descent
Israeli people of Georgian-Jewish descent
Israeli poets
Israeli rappers
Jewish composers
Jewish rappers
Jewish songwriters
Living people
People from Ramat Gan